Punisher: War Zone – Original Motion Picture Score is the official score to the 2008 film Punisher: War Zone. It was composed entirely by Michael Wandmacher and released by Lionsgate Records.

Track list

Personnel
 Michael Wandmacher, composer
 Susie Bench, orchestra conductor and orchestrator
 Tony Blondal, additional orchestrator
 Peter Boyer, orchestrator
 Mark Curry, score mixer
 Jay Faires, music supervisor
 Danniel Hubbert, music supervisor
 Joshua Winget, music editor
 Elliott Goldkind, assistant music editor

Production
The score was composed by Michael Wandmacher who described himself as a big fan of the character of the character Frank Castle.

He has stated that his main focus throughout the making of the score was creating a definitive musical identity for The Punisher, that the character needed something dark, relentless and muscular, but something which also didn't make the audience forget Castle's humanity, his personal torment and deep sadness. He stated that he approached the job equally as a fan and as a composer. Believing that that angle helped tremendously when trying to sort out what to keep and what to scrap.

He also stated that showcasing Castle as flawed and humane, was critical to the score.

Wandmacher has said that he wanted to avoid making the score have a too "military" sound to it as he felt that it would be perceived as either cliché or campy.

Reception
Liz Ferraris of Soundtrack.net stated that Wandmacher's score both reflected the ominous tone of the film and skillfully brought out a necessary lightness to the heavy plot and that the percussion beats were reminiscent of war drums and echoed throughout, as the characters struggle against each other. She also points out that at times, Wandmacher relied on string and woodwind instruments, resulting in a melancholy like sound.

Roger Ebert described the music as "elevator music if the elevator were in a death plunge".

References

Further reading
 Interview with Wandmacher

External links
 Punisher War Zone score

Punisher in music